Cryptogonimidae is a family of trematodes belonging to the order Plagiorchiida.

Genera
Species of Cryptogonimidae are grouped into the following genera:

 Acanthocollaritrema 
 Acanthosiphodera 
 Acanthostomoides 
 Acanthostomum 
 Adlardia 
 Allometadena 
 Anisocladium 
 Anisocoelium 
 Anoiktostoma 
 Aphalloides 
 Aphallus 
 Beluesca 
 Biovarium 
 Brientrema 
 Caimanicola 
 Caulanus 
 Centrovarium 
 Chelediadema 
 Cicesetrema 
 Claribulla 
 Cryptogonimus 
 Diplopharyngotrema 
 Euryakaina 
 Exorchis 
 Gonacanthella 
 Gymnatrema 
 Gynichthys 
 Isocoelioides 
 Isocoelium 
 Latuterus 
 Lobosorchis 
 Mehrailla 
 Mehravermis 
 Neometadena 
 Novemtestis 
 Opistognathotrema 
 Orientodiploproctodaeum 
 Paraisocoelium 
 Perlevilobus 
 Polycryptocylix 
 Polyorchitrema 
 Proctocaecum 
 Pseudoacanthostomum 
 Pseudocryptogonimus 
 Pseudometadena 
 Retrobulla 
 Retrovarium 
 Siphodera 
 Siphoderina 
 Siphomutabilus 
 Stegopa 
 Stemmatostoma 
 Tandemorchis 
 Telogaster 
 Timoniella 
 Varialvus

References

Plagiorchiida